"I Want to Go with You" is the title of a popular song from 1966 (see 1966 in music) by the American country music singer Eddy Arnold. The song was written by country music singer-songwriter Hank Cochran.

Released as a single in early 1966, "I Want to Go with You" peaked at No. 36 on the Billboard Hot 100 chart. It was more successful with country and adult contemporary audiences, reaching No. 1 on both the Billboard country chart for six weeks and the easy listening chart for three weeks.

Charts

References

1966 songs
Eddy Arnold songs
Songs written by Hank Cochran
Song recordings produced by Chet Atkins
1966 singles